The 1967 Tripoli Fair Tournament was the 6th edition of football at the Tripoli International Fair, and was held from 3 to 12 March 1967 in Tripoli, Libya. Four teams participated: Iraq, Sudan, Libya A, and Libya B. Iraq won the tournament.

Matches

References

Tripoli International Fair
1967
1967 Tripoli International Fair